The 1993–94 Czech 1.liga season was the first season of the Czech 1.liga, the second level of ice hockey in the Czech Republic. Fourteen teams participated in the league, and HC Zbrojovka Vsetín and HC Slavia Praha were promoted to the Czech Extraliga.

Regular season

Playoffs

Playoff qualification 

 HC Slovan Ústí nad Labem - HC Baník Hodonín 2:0 (5:1, 6:0)
 TŽ Třinec - H + S Beroun HC 2:0 (4:2, 5:2)
 AZ Havířov - HC Baník Sokolov 2:1 (4:7, 6:2, 3:2)
 HC Prostějov - BK Havlíčkův Brod 0:2 (1:7, 4:6)

Quarterfinals 

 HC Zbrojovka Vsetín - BK Havlíčkův Brod 3:0 (7:1, 8:0, 9:2)
 HC Slavia Praha - AZ Havířov 3:1 (8:3, 3:4, 4:3, 4:2)
 HC Královopolská Brno - TŽ Třinec 3:0 (3:0, 5:3, 4:2)
 HC Slezan Opava - HC Slovan Ústí nad Labem 1:3 (5:0, 1:2, 1:4, 1:5)

Semifinals 

 HC Zbrojovka Vsetín - HC Slovan Ústí nad Labem 3:0 (6:0, 3:0, 3:2 SO)
 HC Slavia Praha - HC Královopolská Brno 3:0 (3:2 SO, 3:0, 6:3)

HC Slavia Praha and HC Zbrojovka Vsetín advance to the Czech Extraliga qualification.

1993-94 Czech Extraliga qualification 

HC Slavia Praha and HC Zbrojovka Vsetín have been promoted to the Czech Extraliga. HC Stadion Hradec Králové and HC Vajgar Jindřichův Hradec have been relegated.

Qualification for relegation 
 HC Přerov – VTJ Tábor 1:3 (1:2, 1:5, 3:2, 0:1)

HC Přerov has been relegated to the Czech 2. liga.

Relegation

1st round 
 HC Milevsko – VTJ Jitex Písek 1:0, 2:6

VTJ Jitex Písek has been promoted, Milevsko advances to the second round.

2nd round 
 VTJ Tábor – HC Milevsko 2:1 (6:1, 2:3, 3:1)

VTJ Tábor has qualified for the 1994-95 Czech 1.Liga season.

External links
 Season on hockeyarchives.info

2
Czech
Czech 1. Liga seasons